Albino bias may refer to:

 Negative, unrealistic and stereotyping depictions of albinism in popular culture
 Actual persecution of people with albinism